Indy may refer to:

Computing and technology
Indy (software), used for Internet access to music
Internet Direct, or "Indy", a software library
SGI Indy, a computer workstation

Periodicals 
The Indy, shorthand for newspapers that include "Independent" in their name, e.g.:
The Independent (Newfoundland), published in Newfoundland and Labrador, Canada
The Independent, a daily British newspaper
The College Hill Independent, published in Providence, Rhode Island
The Indydependent, a newspaper published by the Independent Media Center (also known as "Indymedia" or "Indy Media")

Sports
Indianapolis 500, also known as "Indy 500", a car race
Indy Eleven, Indianapolis' United Soccer League team
Indy Fuel, Indianapolis' ECHL ice hockey team
Indy grab, a board-sport maneuver

Other uses
Indy (gene), a fruit-fly longevity gene
Indy (album), the second EP by Motograter
Independence High School (San Jose, California), also referred to as Indy, a public high school
Indiana Jones, nicknamed "Indy", a fictional adventurer and archaeologist
Indianapolis, nicknamed "Indy", the capital city of the U.S. state of Indiana and its surrounding metropolitan area
Indy Aircraft, an American aircraft manufacturer based in Independence, Iowa
IndyGo, the popular name for the bus service in Indianapolis

See also
Indi (disambiguation)
Indiana (disambiguation)
Indie (disambiguation)